The Bosniak Democratic Party of Sandžak (Serbian / Bosnian: Бошњачка демократска странка Санџака / Bošnjačka demokratska stranka Sandžaka) was a Bosniak minority party in Serbia.

History
The party was formally dissolved in August 2017, though its leader Esad Džudžo had been out of politics since 2012. He has stated that he feels the SDA Sandžak is continuing the work of the BDSS and the List for Sandžak coalition, of which both had been a part until 2012.

Electoral results

Parliamentary elections

References

1996 establishments in Serbia
2017 disestablishments in Serbia
Bosniak political parties in Serbia
Defunct political parties in Serbia
Political parties disestablished in 2017
Political parties established in 1996